Warscheneck (2,388 m) is a mountain of the Totes Gebirge in the Eastern Alps, in Upper Austria. It is located near the town of Liezen, and is a popular mountain for hiking in the summer and ski touring in the winter.

References

Mountains of the Alps
Mountains of Upper Austria